The Point-in-Time Count, or PIT Count, is an annual survey of homeless individuals in the United States conducted by local agencies called Continuums of Care (CoCs) on behalf of the United States Department of Housing and Urban Development. HUD uses the data from PIT counts to evaluate the effectiveness of local agencies' efforts to address homelessness and to determine funding amounts for them, and also compiles it into the Annual Homeless Assessment Report, which is provided to Congress. HUD defines the PIT as a "count of sheltered and unsheltered homeless persons carried out on one night in the last 10 calendar days of January or at such other time as required by HUD."

The PIT consists of an observational count and a survey of homeless individuals, the former to establish a sense of scale and the latter to estimate the number of individuals in various subcategories, like homeless veterans or  homeless youth.

Methodology
Methodology varies slightly between CoCs, to allow them to adapt to their individual needs. Generally, though, the PIT consists of two parts: an unsheltered count and a sheltered count. Both are required to be conducted on a single night in the last ten days of January. The sheltered count requires CoCs to collect information from emergency shelters, transitional housing, and safe havens. The unsheltered count is more difficult as it generally involves volunteers traveling to places where they expect people experiencing homelessness to be (under bridges, encampments, etc). Historically, the PIT count was conducted using pen and paper, but CoCs are increasingly adopting mobile and analytics technology like Hyperion and Counting Us to make things easier.

References 

Homelessness in the United States
United States Department of Housing and Urban Development